The office of vice president of Tajikistan was a political position in Tajikistan until it was abolished.

The following is a list people who have served as Vice President of Tajikistan until its abolishment:

See also
List of leaders of Tajikistan
President of Tajikistan
Prime Minister of Tajikistan

Sources

Politics of Tajikistan
Government of Tajikistan
Vice presidents of Tajikistan
Tajikistan
1990 establishments in Tajikistan
1992 disestablishments in Tajikistan